Borrika is a town and locality in South Australia.

The 2016 Australian census which was conducted in August 2016 reports that Borrika had a population of 42 people.

Borrika is located in the local government area of District Council of Karoonda East Murray, the state electoral district of Hammond and the federal Division of Barker.

References

Towns in South Australia